A platelet is a component of blood.

Platelet or Platelets may also refer to:
 Platelet (horse), a racehorse
 Platelets (journal), a scholarly journal
 Diamond platelet, a crystallographic defect of diamond
 Tectonic platelet, a minor tectonic plate